The 1886 Arkansas gubernatorial election was held on September 6, 1886.

Incumbent Democratic Governor Simon Pollard Hughes Jr. defeated Republican nominee Lafayette Gregg and Agricultural Wheel nominee Charles E. Cunningham with 55.31% of the vote.

General election

Candidates
Simon Pollard Hughes Jr., Democratic, incumbent Governor
Lafayette Gregg, Republican, former Justice of the Arkansas Supreme Court and former trustee of Arkansas Industrial University
Charles E. Cunningham, Agricultural Wheel, Greenback candidate for Arkansas's at-large congressional district in 1882 United States House of Representatives elections in Arkansas

Results

References

1886
Arkansas
Gubernatorial